Bruce Township is a township in Todd County, Minnesota, United States. The population was 564 at the 2000 census.

History
Bruce Township was named for Robert the Bruce, King of the Scots.

Geography

Demographics
As of the census of 2000, there were 564 people, 211 households, and 155 families residing in the township. The population density was 16.0 people per square mile (6.2/km2). There were 271 housing units at an average density of 7.7/sq mi (3.0/km2). The racial makeup of the township was 97.70% White, 0.18% Native American, 0.35% Asian, 1.06% from other races, and 0.71% from two or more races. Hispanic or Latino of any race were 2.30% of the population.

There were 211 households, out of which 32.7% had children under the age of 18 living with them, 65.4% were married couples living together, 2.8% had a female householder with no husband present, and 26.1% were non-families. 23.2% of all households were made up of individuals, and 10.4% had someone living alone who was 65 years of age or older. The average household size was 2.67 and the average family size was 3.17.

In the township the population was spread out, with 28.9% under the age of 18, 8.0% from 18 to 24, 25.5% from 25 to 44, 27.1% from 45 to 64, and 10.5% who were 65 years of age or older. The median age was 38 years. For every 100 females, there were 118.6 males. For every 100 females age 18 and over, there were 116.8 males.

The median income for a household in the township was $40,278, and the median income for a family was $45,625. Males had a median income of $31,458 versus $20,625 for females. The per capita income for the township was $15,762. About 5.2% of families and 11.9% of the population were below the poverty line, including 18.1% of those under age 18 and 27.3% of those age 65 or over.

References

Townships in Todd County, Minnesota
Townships in Minnesota